Olga Bogatyreva (born 1 June 1980) is a Kyrgyzstani swimmer. She competed in the women's 200 metre individual medley and women's 4 × 200 metre freestyle relay events at the 1996 Summer Olympics.

References

External links
 

1980 births
Living people
Kyrgyzstani female medley swimmers
Olympic swimmers of Kyrgyzstan
Swimmers at the 1996 Summer Olympics
Place of birth missing (living people)
Kyrgyzstani female freestyle swimmers